The Data Security Law of the People's Republic of China (referred to as the Data Security Law or DSL) governs the creation, use, storage, transfer, and exploitation of data within China. The law is seen to be primarily targeted at technology companies which have grown increasingly powerful in China over the years. The law is part of a series of interlocking but related national security legislation including the National Security Law of the People's Republic of China, Cybersecurity Law and National Intelligence Law, passed during Xi Jinping's administration as part of efforts to strengthen national security .

Provisions 
The law controversially requires data localisation of data collected by foreign and domestic entities on Chinese citizens. The law prohibits the export of data by technology companies without first the completion of a "cybersecurity review", the process of which is vague and still being developed. In addition, foreign judicial authorities are prohibited from requesting data on Chinese citizens without first seeking permission from Chinese authorities.

Reactions 
Carolyn Bigg of law firms DLA Piper Hong Kong stated that the law represents: “another important piece in the overall data protection regulatory jigsaw in China”, making it: “complex" and "increasingly onerous" for international businesses to navigate through. Chinese technology company stocks fell in reaction to the passing of the law while tech companies such as Meituan, Alibaba and Ant Financial were all placed under regulatory scrutiny prior to its passing. The law is seen to have wide-ranging implications and is seen as another step in the increasing lawfare between China and the United States in areas of trade, intellectual property and national security since the beginning of the US-China trade war which began in 2016.

See also 

 Personal Information Protection Law of the People's Republic of China
 Cybersecurity Law of the People's Republic of China

References 

Law of the People's Republic of China
Laws of China
2021 in China
2021 in law
Data protection